Nguyễn Tiến Linh (born 20 October 1997) is a Vietnamese professional footballer who plays as a striker for V.League 1 club Becamex Bình Dương and the Vietnam national team. In 2021, Tiến Linh was nominated by a panel of sports journalists and football experts for Best Footballer in Asia. He is considered one of the best Vietnamese footballers of his generation. After a match with China, he became the all-time leader for Vietnam in the World Cup qualifiers, passing Lê Công Vinh who had 7 goals.

Early life
Nguyễn was born and raised in the Cam Hoang commune of the Cam Giang district, Hai Duong. At the age of 2, his mother moved to South Korea for work. At the age of 6, he followed his father to Binh Duong. His mother returned to Vietnam when he was 9 years old. Currently, his family owns a football theme coffee shop in the city of Thuận An.

Club career

U19 Becamex Binh Duong

2015
With 5 goals, Tiến Linh was the top scorer of Vietnamese National U-19 Football Championship.

Becamex Binh Duong

2016–present
Tiến Linh made his first debut with Becamex Binh Duong FC in 2016.

Over four years, Tiến Linh scored twenty-six goals, with fifteen in 2018, five in 2020, and six in 2021 before the cancellation of V.League 1. Becamex Binh Duong won the Vietnamese National Football Super Cup and also placed second in the Vietnamese National Football Super Cup, also earning the Vietnamese Bronze Ball in 2022.

International career

2018: First Match for Vietnam and won AFF Championship
On 8 November 2018, Tiến Linh made his debut for the national team in the match against Laos. He scored his first goal for Vietnam against Cambodia in their last group match. At the end, Tiến Linh and Vietnam won 2018 AFF Championship.

2019-present
On 15 October 2019, Tiến Linh scored his first goal in 2022 FIFA World Cup qualification against Indonesia. One month later, he scored the only goal against UAE. In June 2021, he scored three goals in the last three matches of the second round of 2022 FIFA World Cup qualification to promote Vietnam to the third round.

In 2021 AFF Championship, he scored a brace in a 4–0 win against Cambodia, but his team lost in the semifinals to Thailand.

On 1 February 2022, he scored a goal in the match against China to pass Le Cong Vinh as the top scorer for Vietnam in the history of World Cup qualification.

Career statistics

Club

International

International goals

Vietnam U-23
Scores and results list U23 Vietnam's goal tally first.

Vietnam
Scores and results list Vietnam's goal tally first.

Honours

Club
Becamex Bình Dương
Vietnamese National Cup: 2018
Vietnamese Super Cup: 2016

International
Vietnam
AFF Championship: 2018; runner-up: 2022
VFF Cup: 2022
Vietnam U23
Southeast Asian Games (2): 2019, 2021

Individual
Vietnamese Silver Ball: 2022
Vietnamese Bronze Ball: 2021
AFF Championship Top Scorer: 2022
AFF Championship Best XI: 2022

Record
Most Goals In FIFA World Cup qualification in the history of Vietnam national football team: 8 Goals

References 

1997 births
Living people
Vietnamese footballers
Association football forwards
V.League 1 players
Becamex Binh Duong FC players
People from Hải Dương province
2019 AFC Asian Cup players
Competitors at the 2019 Southeast Asian Games
Southeast Asian Games medalists in football
Southeast Asian Games gold medalists for Vietnam
Vietnam international footballers
Competitors at the 2021 Southeast Asian Games